Baglung Airport , also known as Balewa Airport, is a domestic airport serving Baglung, a municipality located in the western region of Gandaki Province of Nepal.

History
Baglung Airport was originally opened in 1973 but ceased to operate after road access to Pokhara was established in 1992. On 14 January 2018, the Civil Aviation Authority of Nepal, airline companies and the Baglung municipality signed an agreement to reopen the airport. On 14 March 2018, Tara Air conducted its test flight to the airport, officially reopening it 26 years after its closure.

Facilities

Airlines and destinations
Since the early 2020s, there are no scheduled services to and from Baglung Airport. Previously Nepal Airlines operated routes to Kathmandu.

See also
List of airports in Nepal

References

External links
 

Airports in Nepal